The 2018 United States Senate election in Wisconsin took place on November 6, 2018, concurrently with a gubernatorial election and U.S. House elections. Incumbent Democratic U.S. Senator Tammy Baldwin won a second term, defeating Republican challenger Leah Vukmir by more than 10 percentage points. The primary elections were held on August 14, with a filing deadline on June 1. Baldwin was unopposed for the Democratic nomination, while Vukmir defeated Charles Barman, Griffin Jones, George Lucia and Kevin Nicholson in the Republican primary.

Democratic primary

Candidates

Nominee
 Tammy Baldwin, incumbent U.S. Senator

Endorsements

Results

Republican primary

Candidates

Nominee
 Leah Vukmir, state senator and State Senate Assistant Majority Leader

Eliminated in primary
 Charles Barman
 Griffin Jones
 George Lucia
 Kevin Nicholson, businessman and member of the Wisconsin Board of Veterans Affairs

Declined
 David Clarke, former Milwaukee County Sheriff
 Sean Duffy, U.S. Representative (running for reelection)
 Mike Gallagher, U.S. Representative
 Glenn Grothman, U.S. Representative
 Eric Hovde, businessman and candidate for the U.S. Senate in 2012
 Rebecca Kleefisch, Lieutenant Governor of Wisconsin
 Nicole Schneider, businesswoman
 Charlie Sykes, talk radio host
 Scott Walker, Governor of Wisconsin (running for reelection)
 Dale Kooyenga, state representative
 Duey Stroebel, state senator
 Scott Fitzgerald, State Senate Majority Leader

Endorsements

Polling

Results

General election

Endorsements

Debates
Complete video of debate, October 8, 2018
Complete video of debate, October 13, 2018

Predictions

Polling

with Kevin Nicholson

with generic Republican

with David Clarke

with Sean Duffy

Results 
Despite initial expectations of a potentially close race, Baldwin ended up winning by over 10 percentage points, which was the highest margin of victory for a Wisconsin Democratic statewide candidate in 2018. She ran up the margins in the traditional Democratic strongholds of Milwaukee and Madison, but also won in western Wisconsin, Green Bay and most of the counties bordering Illinois, including Racine, Rock, and Kenosha counties.

By congressional district 
Despite winning by over 10 percentage points, Baldwin only won 3 out of 8 Congressional districts.

See also
 2018 United States Senate elections
 2018 Wisconsin gubernatorial election
 2018 Wisconsin elections

Notes

References

External links
Candidates at Vote Smart
Candidates at Ballotpedia
Campaign finance at FEC
Campaign finance at OpenSecrets

Official campaign websites
Tammy Baldwin (D) for Senate
John Schiess (I) for Senate (write-in)
Leah Vukmir (R) for Senate

2018
Wisconsin
United States Senate